Colm de Buitléar (born 6 November 1997) is an Irish rugby union player who is currently a member of the Connacht academy. He plays as a wing or fullback, and represents Corinthians in the All-Ireland League.

Born in Dublin, Ireland, de Buitléar first began playing rugby for Carraroe-based An Ghaeltacht Rugbaí, a club that was part-founded by his father, Colm Senior , before going on to join Galway Corinthians.

Connacht
Whilst still in the academy, de Buitléar made his senior competitive debut for Connacht in their 22–10 win against French side Bordeaux Bègles during the 2018–19 Challenge Cup on 13 October 2018.

References

External links
Connacht Profile
Pro14 Profile

1997 births
Living people
Rugby union players from County Galway
Irish rugby union players
Connacht Rugby players
Rugby union wings
Rugby union fullbacks